Svatopluk (in modern Czech) or Svätopluk (in modern Slovak) is a Slavic given name. It may refer to:

People
Svatopluk I of Moravia (c. 840–894), prince of Great Moravia from 870/871 to 894
Svätopluk II (died c. 906), a son of Svatopluk I, prince of the Nitrian principality from 894 to c. 906
Svatopluk of Bohemia (died 1109), ruler of Bohemia from 1107 to 1109
Svatopluk Čech (1846–1908), Czech writer, journalist and poet
Svatopluk Havelka (1925–2009), Czech composer
Svatopluk Innemann (1896–1945), Czech film director, cinematographer, screenwriter, film editor and actor
Svatopluk Pluskal (1930-2005), Czech footballer
Svatopluk Svoboda (1886-1971), Czechoslovakian Olympic gymnast
Svatopluk Turek (1900-1972), Czech writer using the pen name T. Svatopluk

Other uses
 Svätopluk (opera), a Slovak opera by Eugen Suchoň

See also
Świętopełk (disambiguation) Polish version
Sviatopolk (disambiguation) Ukrainian, Russian, Bulgarian version
Zwentibold German version
Svätopluk (disambiguation) Slovak version
Svante Swedish version

Czech masculine given names
Masculine given names
Slavic masculine given names